Gustav Mckeon (born 18 October 2003) is a French cricketer who plays internationally for the French national cricket team. In July 2022, he became the youngest cricketer to score a Twenty20 International (T20I) century and became the first cricketer to score back-to-back centuries in T20Is.

Career 
Mckeon made his international T20I debut on 24 July 2022, scoring 76 on debut against the Czech Republic. In his next game against Switzerland, Mckeon scored 109, becoming the youngest cricketer to score a T20I century. Then, in his next game against Norway, he scored 101, becoming the first cricketer to score back-to-back centuries in T20Is. He also broke the record for most runs scored in the first three innings of a men's T20I career with this century. He then went on to score an 87 against Estonia, becoming just the 5th cricketer to score 4 back-to-back half-centuries.

Mckeon's feats had him nominated for the ICC Men's Player of the Month for July 2022 award.

References 

Living people
2003 births
French cricketers